Edward Vincent Winchester (December 16, 1970 – April 22, 2020) was a Canadian lightweight rower. He won a gold medal at the 2000 World Rowing Championships in Zagreb with Ben Storey in the lightweight men's coxless pair.

References

1970 births
2020 deaths
Canadian male rowers
World Rowing Championships medalists for Canada
Sportspeople from Saint John, New Brunswick